Christoph Gottlob Müller (1785–1858) is generally considered to be the founder of the Wesleyan Church in Germany. He converted himself to Methodism around 1806, after he had fled to England during the Napoleonic wars.

External links

Muller, Christoph Gottlob
Muller, Christoph Gottlob
Muller, Christoph Gottlob
Muller
Wesleyan Methodists